John Owen Williams may refer to:

 John Owen Williams (Pedrog) (1853–1932), Welsh Congregational minister and poet
 John Owen Williams (record producer) (born 1951), English A&R executive and record producer